Outpost of the Mounties is a 1939 American Western film directed by Charles C. Coleman and starring Charles Starrett.

Plot
In this adventure, a courageous Canadian Mountie must bring peace an embattled miner and an unscrupulous trader whose price mark-ups are beginning to hurt the community. They fight to frequently that when the avaricious proprietor is killed, the young man becomes the prime suspect.

Cast
 Charles Starrett as Sergeant Neal Crawford
 Iris Meredith as Norma Daniels
 Stanley Brown as Larry Daniels
 Kenneth MacDonald as R.A. Kirby
 Edmund Cobb as Burke
 Bob Nolan as Mountie Bob
 Lane Chandler as Mountie Cooper
 Dick Curtis as Wade Beaumont
 Alberto Morin as Jacques LaRue (as Albert Morin)
 Hal Taliaferro as Evans
 Pat O'Hara as Inspector Wainwright
 Sons of the Pioneers as Singing Mounties

See also
 List of American films of 1939

References

External links
 

1939 films
American Western (genre) films
1939 Western (genre) films
Films directed by Charles C. Coleman
American black-and-white films
Columbia Pictures films
Royal Canadian Mounted Police in fiction
1930s American films